Governor McCarthy or MacCarthy may refer to:

Charles MacCarthy (British Army officer) (1764–1824), British military governor of multiple territories in West Africa between 1812 and 1824
Charles Justin MacCarthy (1811–1864), 12th Governor of British Ceylon
Charles J. McCarthy (1861–1929), 5th Territorial Governor of Hawaii from 1918 to 1921
George A. McCarthy (fl. 1970s–2000s), Acting Governor of the Cayman Islands in 2005